Madis Vihmann (born 5 October 1995) is a retired Estonian professional footballer who played as a centre back. He played in the Estonia national team in 19 matches.

Club career

Elva
Vihmann came through the Elva youth system. He made his debut for the first team on 23 April 2011.

Levadia (loan)
In 2013, Vihmann moved to Levadia on loan where he primarily played for the club's reserve side Levadia II. He made his debut in the Meistriliiga on 18 August 2014, in a 7–0 away win over Tallinna Kalev.

Flora
On 19 December 2014, Vihmann signed for Flora. He helped Flora win two Meistriliiga titles in 2015 and 2017.

Stabæk (loan)
On 16 March 2019, Vihmann joined Eliteserien club Stabæk on two-year loan deal.

St Johnstone (loan)
On 26 July 2019, Vihmann cut short his loan deal with Stabæk to join Scottish Premiership club St Johnstone on a season-long loan, with the option to either extend the loan by another year or to make the deal permanent. He made his debut the next day in a 1–2 away loss to Forfar Athletic in a group stage match of the Scottish League Cup. 

The loan deal with St Johnstone was ended on 31 January 2020 and Vihmann returned to Flora. A few days later he chose to retire from football, citing only private personal reasons for his retirement.

International career
Vihmann has represented Estonia at under-21 and under-23 levels. He made his senior international debut for Estonia on 12 June 2017, in a 2–1 away victory over Latvia in a friendly.

Career statistics

Club

International

Honours

Club
Levadia II
Esiliiga: 2013

Flora
Meistriliiga: 2015, 2017
Estonian Cup: 2015–16
Estonian Supercup: 2016

Estonia U21
Under-21 Baltic Cup: 2014

References

External links

1995 births
Living people
Sportspeople from Valga, Estonia
Estonian footballers
Association football defenders
FC Elva players
Esiliiga players
FCI Levadia U21 players
Meistriliiga players
FCI Levadia Tallinn players
FC Flora players
Eliteserien players
Stabæk Fotball players
St Johnstone F.C. players
Scottish Professional Football League players
Estonia youth international footballers
Estonia under-21 international footballers
Estonia international footballers
Estonian expatriate footballers
Expatriate footballers in Norway
Expatriate footballers in Scotland
Estonian expatriate sportspeople in Norway
Estonian expatriate sportspeople in Scotland